{{DISPLAYTITLE:1D-chiro-Inositol}}

1D-chiro-Inositol (formerly D-chiro-inositol, commonly abbreviated DCI) is a member of a family of related substances often referred to collectively as "inositol", although that term encompasses several isomers of questionable biological relevance, including 1L-chiro-inositol. myo-Inositol is converted into DCI by an insulin dependent NAD/NADH epimerase enzyme. It is known to be an important secondary messenger in insulin signal transduction. DCI accelerates the dephosphorylation of glycogen synthase and pyruvate dehydrogenase, rate limiting enzymes of non-oxidative and oxidative glucose disposal. DCI may act to bypass defective normal epimerization of myo-inositol to DCI associated with insulin resistance and at least partially restore insulin sensitivity and glucose disposal. One pilot study found males taking it had increased androgens and reduced estrogen.

References 

Inositol